Monpazier is a commune in the Dordogne department in Nouvelle-Aquitaine, southwest France, located 40 kilometres from Bergerac Airport. It is a member of the Les Plus Beaux Villages de France ("The most beautiful villages of France") association.

History

Monpazier is a 13th-century bastide town founded in 1285 by King Edward I of England, who was also Duke of Gascony. It was created by an act of paréage, whereby the lord of Biron supplied the land, Edward the authority and permission, with any profits from taxes or commercial activity split between the two. Like other bastides, it was constructed using a grid pattern, with a square at its centre, one end of which contains an open market hall. One of the best preserved, it contains many original features.

Attractions and events
The parish church of Monpazier is St. Dominique, built from the 13th through the 16th centuries. The church was built in a rectangular parcel and adjoins with a corner of the marketplace. The apse was added in the fifteenth century and the choir was believed to have been completed in 1506.

The town includes a four-star hotel named after its founder, the Hôtel Edward Premier.

During the summer months, Monpazier hosts a number of events of interest to tourists, including a cycle race around the bastide (usually at the start of August), a Medieval day ('fete medieval'),  a Kermesse and several specialist markets. Each July the Chorale of Monpazier gives a concert in the church.

Population

Its inhabitants are called Monpaziérois. The actor Julien Guiomar (1928-2010) spent his last years in Monpazier.

See also
Communes of the Dordogne department

References

Sources
 *

External links

 Monpazier seen from the sky by Philippe Dufour
 Bastideum - Museum in Monpazier

Communes of Dordogne
Plus Beaux Villages de France